Barry Daly may refer to:
 Barry Daly (hurler)
 Barry Daly (rugby union)